Kein Hüsung is an East German film. It was released in 1954.

External links
 

1954 films
East German films
1950s German-language films
Films based on poems
Films set in the 1840s
German drama films
1954 drama films
German black-and-white films
1950s German films